Pierre Leclerc (born 24 October 1953) is a Canadian gymnast. He competed in seven events at the 1976 Summer Olympics.

References

1953 births
Living people
Canadian male artistic gymnasts
Olympic gymnasts of Canada
Gymnasts at the 1976 Summer Olympics
People from Sainte-Thérèse, Quebec
Sportspeople from Quebec